Let's Kiss and Make Up may refer to:

 "Let's Kiss and Make Up" (song), a 1989 song by the Field Mice, covered in 1990 by Saint Etienne
 "Let's Kiss and Make Up", a song by George and Ira Gershwin introduced in Funny Face, 1927
 "Let's Kiss and Make Up", a 1962 song by Bobby Vinton

See also
 Kiss and Make Up (disambiguation)